A researcher is a person engaged in conducting research.

It may also refer to:

 Researcher (horse), a racehorse
 NOAAS Researcher (R 103), an American oceanographic research vessel

See also
 Research (disambiguation)